Faithful is the third studio album from Jenn Bostic. She released the album on June 1, 2015.

Critical reception

Giving the album a ten out of ten at Cross Rhythms, Stephen Luff writes, "This album is outstanding and can only further her success!" Derek Walker, rating the album three and a half out of five from The Phantom Tollbooth, states, "With a generous fourteen songs and no real clunkers, this is worth investigating."

Track listing

References

2015 albums